This is a list of science fiction films released in the 2000s. These films include core elements of science fiction, but can cross into other genres. They have been released to a cinema audience by the commercial film industry and are widely distributed with reviews by reputable critics. Collectively, the science fiction films from the 2000s have received six Academy Awards, twenty Saturn Awards, two Hugo Awards, one Nebula Award, five BAFTA awards, and six Magritte Awards. However, these films also received 17 Golden Raspberry Awards.

List

See also 

 List of science fiction films of the 2010s

Notes

References

External links 

Lists of 2000s films by genre
2000s